This Is What Makes Us is the debut studio album by Scottish indie rock band Foxface. It was released on 5 November 2007 on Gargleblast Records.

The album was produced by Andy Miller and features guest performances from folk musicians John McCusker and Andy Cutting.

Critical reception
The Scotsman called the album "a dynamic debut," writing that it fashions "an idiosyncratic link between folk influences, pop melodies and more strident rock'n'roll elements."

Track listing
All songs written by Foxface
"Monster Seas"
"The Cold South"
"Across to Texa"
"We Can't Afford to Go"
"Winners/Losers"
"Face Looks Familiar"
"Line and Hand"
"Honour and Promotion"
"Last Waltz"
"Dragstrip"
"What Do You Believe In?"

Personnel
Michael Angus - vocals, guitar, production, artwork
D. John Ferguson - drums, accordion, production, artwork
Jenny Bell - bass, vocals, production, artwork
John McCusker - fiddle ("We Can't Afford to Go", "Dragstrip")
Andy Cutting - diatonic accordion ("Honour and Promotion", "Dragstrip")
Andy Miller - production, recording
Kenny McLeod - mastering
Charlie Blackledge - photograph

References

2007 albums
Foxface (band) albums